Humprecht Jan Czernin (14 February 1628, Radenín – 3 March 1682, Kosmonosy) was a Czech noble and diplomat, member of the Czernin family.

Biography
Humprecht Jan Czernin was the Habsburg imperial ambassador to Venice and Rome. He was appointed ambassador of King Leopold in Venice in 1659.

Humprecht died at the castle in Kosmonosy on 3 March 1682 at the age of 54 years. He was buried in the chapel of St. Vitus Cathedral in Prague, but his heart was placed in a tin box and placed in the Czernin Chapel of the Church of the Assumption of the Virgin Mary in Stará Boleslav.

Legacy
The Czernin Palace was commissioned by him in the 1660s. He had also the Humprecht Castle in Sobotka built, named after him. It was built as his summer house and hunting castle in 1666–1668.

References

1628 births
1682 deaths
People from Tábor District
Czech diplomats
Humprecht Jan
Bohemian nobility